Senator Foran may refer to:

Arthur F. Foran (1882–1961), New Jersey State Senate
Walter E. Foran (1919–1986), New Jersey State Senate